Étienne Brûlé Park is located in the Humber River valley just north of Bloor Street West in Toronto, Ontario, Canada. It is named after Étienne Brûlé, an early French explorer in the Toronto area. It is believed that Étienne Brûlé was the first European to see Lake Ontario in 1615, from a high point of land beside the Humber.

Characteristic features 
The Old Mill and The Old Mill Bridge - Mills have existed at this site since 1793 when King's Mill, Toronto's first industrial building, supplied wood for the construction of Fort York (1793), shipbuilding and for early Toronto (York).  A bridge has stood over the Humber River at this location since 1837. The present arched stone bridge was built in 1916. Both the mill and the bridge are historically significant and have been designated under the Ontario Heritage Act.

Fishing at the park 
Significant improvements are being made to the health of this fishery based on the Humber River Fisheries Management Plan.
One of the projects is to improve fish movement in the watershed.
Other initiatives to help protect fish during the sensitive life cycle periods and to promote angling opportunities are also underway.

Entrances and public transit 

Étienne Brûlé Park can be entered at the south from Old Mill Road or at the north from Lundy Avenue. The park is only five minutes walk from Old Mill subway station. Pedestrians and cyclists can also travel through the park on the Tommy Thompson Trail, using entrances at Pasadena Gardens and Lundy Avenue. The Tommy Thompson Trail connects King's Mill Park to Lambton Woods. During the winter months, the parks also allow cross-country skiing.

References

External links
 
https://www.alltrails.com/parks/canada/ontario/etienne-brule-park

Parks in Toronto